Lagle may refer to:
Lauri Lagle (born 1981), Estonian actor and director
Lagle Parek (born 1941), Estonian politician

Estonian feminine given names
Estonian-language surnames